The Addams Family is a 2019 computer-animated supernatural black comedy film directed by Conrad Vernon and Greg Tiernan and based on the characters created by Charles Addams. The film stars the voices of Oscar Isaac, Charlize Theron, Chloë Grace Moretz, Finn Wolfhard, Nick Kroll, Snoop Dogg, Bette Midler, and Allison Janney.

The film was theatrically released in the United States and in Canada by United Artists Releasing on October 11, 2019. It received mixed reviews from critics for its narrative and screenplay, though the voice acting and animation were praised, and grossed $203 million on a $24 million budget.

It is the final project for Kelly Asbury, who served as a story consultant, before his death a year after the film's release in June 2020.

A sequel was released on October 1, 2021.

Plot

An angry mob of villagers that rejects anything macabre in nature disrupts the midnight wedding ceremony of Gomez and Morticia and drives them away with the rest of the Addams clan. During the chaos, Grandmama buys Fester time to evacuate Gomez, Morticia, and Thing. Gomez and Morticia decide to move to New Jersey, a place "no one would be caught dead in." There, Gomez, Morticia, and Thing find their "perfect" home in an abandoned asylum on a hill. They meet Lurch, an escaped mental patient whom they hit when Thing was driving their car, and immediately recruit him as their butler.

Thirteen years later, the Addams family continue to live their gloomy lives in isolation from the outside world. Gomez prepares his son Pugsley for his upcoming "Sabre Mazurka", a rite of passage that every Addams family member takes. Morticia struggles to keep their daughter, Wednesday, from wanting to experience the world outside the mansion after a balloon and confetti appear on their property.

Elsewhere, reality TV host Margaux Needler, who is building a perfect planned community called "Assimilation" so her show will have a successful season finale, discovers the Addams family's household and becomes determined to rid the town of it when the family refuses to change, starting with spreading rumors about the Addamses through social media, claiming that they are freaks. Wednesday then meets Margaux's neglected daughter Parker and persuades Morticia to let her attend junior high school. Pugsley struggles with the complicated traditions and pressure of his Mazurka, even with the guidance of Gomez and Uncle Fester. Grandmama arrives at the house for the event.

At school, Wednesday stands up for Parker and her twin friends Layla and Kayla from the school's bully Bethany and befriends them after she resurrects some dead frogs and commands them to attack Bethany. Later on, the two discuss their frustrations and change their dressing habits – Parker becomes more gothic and Wednesday dresses more colorfully – to the shock of both of their mothers, with Margaux vowing to destroy the Addamses. After an argument with Morticia, Wednesday decides to run away in secret and stay with Parker for a while, which Pugsley inadvertently tells Morticia.

As Cousin Itt arrives at the Addams household, Wednesday and Parker discover a secret room under Parker's house revealing that Margaux has planted hidden cameras in every house she designed in town. Margaux catches the two and locks them in the attic, but Wednesday breaks them out. Margaux rallies the townsfolk to attack the mansion just as the entire Addams clan arrive for Pugsley's Mazurka.

During the Mazurka, Pugsley fails in front of the whole family, but Gomez admits he forgot to let him be who he is. The mob arrives flinging boulders, severely damaging the mansion and trapping the family inside. Pugsley uses his love of bombs and destruction to defend his family and manages to destroy the mob's trebuchet. Wednesday and Parker join in and help everyone out of the wreckage safely with help of the living tree Ichabod.

As Margaux tries to take control once more, her treachery is revealed by Parker. Assimilation's civilians see that the Addamses are not monsters, but a family, as Wednesday and Parker states that everyone is weird in their own unique way, revealing also Margaux's spying on the civilians, who are violated upon hearing this. Margaux's agent Glenn carries a message from the network stating that her show is now cancelled for her crimes thanks to Parker exposing her mother's true nature by live-streaming her tirade against the civilians with her phone. As Fester comes up with a compromise for Margaux, Assimilation's civilians offer to make amends with the Addamses.

After they work together to rebuild the mansion, the Addams family and Assimilation's civilians live in peace. Margaux becomes Fester's business partner, selling homes to the other members of the Addams clan, and Pugsley completes his Mazurka.

Voice cast 

 Oscar Isaac as Gomez Addams, Morticia's husband and Wednesday and Pugsley's father
 Charlize Theron as Morticia Addams (née Frump), Gomez's wife and Wednesday and Pugsley's mother
 Chloë Grace Moretz as Wednesday Addams, Gomez and Morticia's daughter, Pugsley's older sister, and a mad science child prodigy.  
 Finn Wolfhard as Pugsley Addams, Gomez and Morticia's son and Wednesday's younger brother
 Nick Kroll as Uncle Fester, Gomez's older brother, Morticia's brother-in-law and Wednesday and Pugsley's uncle
 Snoop Dogg as Itt, Gomez and Fester's hairy cousin
 Bette Midler as Grandmama, Gomez and Fester's mother, Morticia's mother-in-law and Wednesday and Pugsley's paternal grandmother
 Allison Janney as Margaux Needler, a sly and greedy reality TV show host and homemaking guru
 Martin Short as Grandpa Frump, Morticia's late father whom she contacts through a séance
 Catherine O'Hara as Grandma Frump, Morticia's late mother whom she contacts through a séance
 Tituss Burgess as Glenn, Margaux's agent
 Jenifer Lewis as Great Auntie Sloom, Grandmama's strict and cold sister, Gomez' aunt, and Wednesday and Pugsley's great-aunt with a missing left eye and stilts under her dress who judges Pugsley's Mazurka
 Elsie Fisher as Parker Needler, Margaux's neglected and rebellious daughter who befriends Wednesday
 Conrad Vernon as:
 Lurch, the Addams Family's butler
 A unnamed priest that presides over Gomez and Morticia's family that is related to them 
 The spirit of the house
 Dr. Flambé, a devil-like relative of the Addams family who can light his head on fire.
 Aimee Garcia as Denise, a camera operator who works for Margaux
 Scott Underwood as Mitch, a member of Margaux's film crew
 Mikey Madison as Candi the barista, who works in Assimilation
 Chelsea Frei as Bethany, a popular girl who frequently bullies and antagonizes Parker
 Pom Klementieff as Layla and Kayla, twin girls who are Parker's friends
 Deven Green as Ms. Gravely, a teacher at Parker's school
 Maggie Wheeler as Trudy Pickering, an inhabitant of Assimilation
 Harland Williams as:
 Norman Pickering, an inhabitant of Assimilation and the husband of Trudy
 Ggerri

Production
In 2010, after Illumination Entertainment acquired the rights to The Addams Family comics, they began work on the film at Universal Pictures as a stop-motion animation directed by Tim Burton and produced by Chris Meledandri. After development stopped, however, in 2013, Metro-Goldwyn-Mayer announced that they would produce the animated film based on The Addams Family comics, with Pamela Pettler then writing the screenplay. In June 2019, it was announced that Bron Creative is co-financing the film with MGM as part of a multi-picture co-financing agreement with the studio. In October 2017, it was announced that the film would be directed and produced by Conrad Vernon. Additionally, Gail Berman, Alex Schwartz, and Alison O'Brien also produced the film. Matt Lieberman wrote the finished screenplay, with story by credit for Lieberman, Erica Rivinoja, and Vernon. The film was animated by Cinesite Studios and Nitrogen Studios with Tabitha Shick overseeing it for MGM. In December 2017, it was reported that Oscar Isaac was in talks to voice the role of Gomez Addams in the film. In June 2018, Isaac was officially cast, alongside Charlize Theron, Allison Janney, Bette Midler, Chloë Grace Moretz, Finn Wolfhard and Nick Kroll. In July 2018, Aimee Garcia joined the voice cast. In August 2018, Elsie Fisher was added as well. In November 2018, Catherine O'Hara and Martin Short were added as Morticia's parents, In August 2019, Snoop Dogg, Tituss Burgess, and Jenifer Lewis joined as Cousin Itt, Glenn, and Great Auntie Sloom, respectively.

Music

Migos, Karol G, Snoop Dogg, and Rock Mafia recorded a song for the film called "My Family", which was released on September 13, 2019 and plays during the end credits; while Christina Aguilera released the song "Haunted Heart" from the film's soundtrack on September 27, 2019, which plays in the film's opening. HeathisHuman created an updated version of Vic Mizzy's original theme song that plays at the film's ending.

Marketing
Metro-Goldwyn-Mayer launched the film with a global promotion partner campaign worth $150 million, their largest ever outside the 007 franchise. They spent a total of $72 million on prints and advertisements for the film.

Release

Theatrical
The film was theatrically released by Metro-Goldwyn-Mayer through United Artists Releasing in the United States on October 11, 2019 with Universal Pictures handling the international rights. It was previously set for October 18, 2019 before being moved up to October 11, 2019 to avoid direct competition with Maleficent: Mistress of Evil.

Home media
The film was released by Universal Pictures Home Entertainment digitally on December 24, 2019, followed by a DVD and Blu-ray release on January 21, 2020.

Reception

Box office
The Addams Family grossed $100 million in the United States and Canada and $103 million in other territories for a worldwide total of $203 million. Deadline Hollywood calculated the net profit of the film to be $76million, when factoring together all expenses and revenues.

In the United States and Canada, the film was released alongside Gemini Man and Jexi and was projected to gross $28–30 million from 4,007 theaters in its opening weekend. The film made $9.7 million on its first day including $1.25 million from Thursday night previews. It went on to debut to $30.3 million, finishing second behind holdover Joker. It made $16.3 million in its second weekend, $12 million in its third and $8.2 million in its fourth, finishing fourth, third and sixth, respectively.

Critical response
The website's critical consensus reads, "The Addams Familys starry voice cast and eye-catching animation aren't enough to outweigh its saccharine handling of the delightfully dark source material." On Metacritic, the film has a weighted average score of 46 out of 100, based on 22 critics, indicating "mixed or average reviews". Audiences polled by CinemaScore gave the film an average grade of "B+" on an A+ to F scale, while PostTrak reported that surveyed children and parents gave it 4 and 3.5 out of 5 stars, respectively.

Accolades

Sequel

On October 15, 2019, it was announced by Metro-Goldwyn-Mayer that a sequel was scheduled for release on October 22, 2021, with Conrad Vernon and Greg Tiernan reprising their roles as co-directors, and Cinesite Studios returning as animators. On October 8, 2020, Bill Hader and Javon "Wanna" Walton joined the cast; Hader voices a new character named Cyrus, while Walton replaces Finn Wolfhard as the voice of Pugsley. It was also pushed forward two weeks to October 8, 2021. On January 21, 2021, it was again pushed forward one week to October 1, 2021, allowing another MGM film, No Time to Die to take over the slot. In July 2021, Wallace Shawn was revealed to have voiced a new character for the film. In August 2021, the film shifted its release for a simultaneous premium video on demand rental and theatrical release on the October 1 date, in the United States and Canada, due to the COVID-19 pandemic and the rising cases of the SARS-CoV-2 Delta variant.

References

External links

2019 films
2019 3D films
2019 computer-animated films
2010s American animated films
2019 black comedy films
2010s children's animated films
The Addams Family films
American black comedy films
American computer-animated films
Canadian black comedy films
Films directed by Conrad Vernon
Films directed by Greg Tiernan
Films produced by Conrad Vernon
Films scored by Mychael Danna
Films scored by Jeff Danna
Films set in New Jersey
Films with screenplays by Matt Lieberman
Metro-Goldwyn-Mayer films
Universal Pictures films
Bron Studios films
Metro-Goldwyn-Mayer animated films
Universal Pictures animated films
3D animated films
Films with screenplays by Conrad Vernon
Animated films about families
Films about witchcraft
Films based on television series
American dark fantasy films
Films produced by Gail Berman
Films with screenplays by Pamela Pettler
American children's animated fantasy films
American comedy horror films
Canadian animated feature films
Canadian computer-animated films
Canadian comedy horror films
2010s English-language films
2010s Canadian films
Canadian animated comedy films